Queensbury and Shelf was an urban district in the West Riding of Yorkshire from 1937 to 1974. The district was formed by a County Review Order by the amalgamation of Queensbury and Shelf urban districts.

Queensbury and Shelf were included in the metropolitan county of West Yorkshire in 1974 under the Local Government Act 1972. The former urban district was divided between two metropolitan boroughs:  the wards of Shelf East and Shelf West were included in Calderdale, and the remaining wards in the Metropolitan Borough of Bradford.

External links
 Vision of Britain: Queensbury and Shelf

Districts of England abolished by the Local Government Act 1972
History of West Yorkshire
History of Bradford
Local government in Bradford
Local government in Calderdale
Urban districts of England